The following lists events that happened during 1989 in Laos.

Incumbents
President: Souphanouvong 
Prime Minister: Kaysone Phomvihane

Events

March
26 March - 1989 Laotian parliamentary election

Births
26 April - Vilayphone Vongphachanh, swimmer
2 June - Kilakone Siphonexay, athlete
3 June - Viengsavanh Sayyaboun, footballer

References

 
Years of the 20th century in Laos
Laos
1980s in Laos
Laos